Jan Roger Skyttesæter (born 8 April 1956) is a former Norwegian archer. He was born in Oslo. He competed in archery at the 1984 Summer Olympics in Los Angeles, where he placed 23rd in the individual competition.

References

External links

1956 births
Living people
Sportspeople from Oslo
Norwegian male archers
Olympic archers of Norway
Archers at the 1984 Summer Olympics